Niklas Jihde (born June 19, 1976, in Uppåkra, Sweden) is a Swedish former floorball player. Jihde has won the Floorball World Championship with Sweden five times, in 1998, 2000, 2002, 2004, and 2006. He scored 80 goals with the Swedish national floorball team.

Since 2005, Jihde has been ranked as a 2nd world's best floorball player by Innebandymagazinet behind Finnish phenomenon Mika Kohonen.

References

1976 births
Swedish floorball players
Swedish expatriate sportspeople in Switzerland
Living people
21st-century Swedish people